Callophyllis is a red algae genus in the family Kallymeniaceae. Several species are exploited as edible seaweeds under the common name carola, most commonly Callophyllis variegata.

References

External links

Red algae genera
Kallymeniaceae
Taxa named by Friedrich Traugott Kützing
Edible algae